Antsiferovskaya is a rural locality (a village) in Kemskoye Rural Settlement, Vytegorsky District, Vologda Oblast, Russia. The population was 4 as of 2002.

Geography 
Antsiferovskaya is located 99 km southeast of Vytegra (the district's administrative centre) by road. Agafonovskaya is the nearest rural locality.

References 

Rural localities in Vytegorsky District